Ernő Söptei (12 February 1925 – 15 January 1999) was a Hungarian sprint canoeist who competed in the early 1950s. He finished seventh in the C-2 10000 m event at the 1952 Summer Olympics in Helsinki.

Söptei died in Toronto.

References

1925 births
1999 deaths
Canoeists at the 1952 Summer Olympics
Hungarian male canoeists
Olympic canoeists of Hungary
Canoeists from Toronto
20th-century Hungarian people